Anarta inconcinna is a species of cutworm or dart moth in the family Noctuidae. It was first described by Smith in 1888 and it is found in North America.

The MONA or Hodges number for Anarta inconcinna is 10252.

References

Further reading

 
 
 

Anarta (moth)
Articles created by Qbugbot
Moths described in 1888